The 2018 Pakistan Super League player draft was the player draft for third season of the Pakistan Super League, held on 12 November 2017 in Lahore. Each franchise was allowed to pick 16 players from total 501 players; including Pakistani and foreign cricketers who took part in the draft. They divided into five different categories; Platinum, Diamond, Gold, Silver and Emerging and Supplementary. This was Multan Sultans' inaugural season, they were allowed to pick 9 players prior to the draft.

Key

Retained players
The list for the names of 9 retained players in each five teams was announced on 5 October 2017. The new team Multan Sultans picked their 9 pre-draft players from the players released by other franchises, and their names were announced on 10 October.

Transfers
On 3 October 2017, Shahid Afridi's transfer from Zalmi to Kings was confirmed, occupying one Gold and two Silver picks, which was named as the biggest trade of the season. It was also announced on 5 October that the gold pick Mohammad Rizwan had been picked by Kings in trade for the gold pick Sohail Khan to Qalandars. On 6 October, it was reported that United bought Iftikhar Ahmed from Zalmi in exchange of supplementary pick in second round of draft.

Players released
Further players; who played in 2017 PSL, were released by their franchises, who are:

New players
On 30 September, Chairman PCB Najam Sethi announced that following players are the new top signings for the league:

 JP Duminy
 Chris Lynn
 Mitchell Johnson
 Angelo Mathews
 Rashid Khan
 Evin Lewis
 Imran Tahir
 John Hastings
 Mustafizur Rahman
 Mitchell McClenaghan
 Colin Munro
 Luke Ronchi
 Colin Ingram
 Darren Bravo
 Lendl Simmons

On 14 October, some more names for the new signed in players were revealed:

 Tim Bresnan
 Adil Rashid
 James Vince
 Colin de Grandhomme
 Albie Morkel
 Wayne Parnell
 Jason Holder

It was reported on 20 October that the two players from the China national cricket team were signed in by franchise Zalmi:
 Li Jian
 Zhang Yufei

Draft picks
A total of 501 players; 193 Pakistani and 308 overseas were a part of the draft. They were allowed to stack up their squad with a maximum of 21 players by picking them from the categories in following order with a varying range and limit in price:
one player each from:
Platinum; 
Diamond; minimum price of 
Gold; 
two players each from:
Silver; 
Emerging; 
up to five players from Supplementary Rounds; they could be called in as replacements for those players who don't agree to play in Pakistan

Following players were picked by the franchises in the draft:

Replacements
Following players were picked in PSL replacement draft.

Notes

References

External links

Pakistan Super League 2019 Points Table

Pakistan Super League player drafts
2018 Pakistan Super League